George Little (1 December 1915 – March 2002) was an English professional footballer who played as a winger in the Football League for Doncaster Rovers and York City, in non-League football for Throckley Welfare, Scunthorpe United, Frickley Colliery and Worksop Town.

References

1915 births
Footballers from Newcastle upon Tyne
2002 deaths
English footballers
Association football wingers
Throckley Welfare F.C. players
Doncaster Rovers F.C. players
York City F.C. players
Scunthorpe United F.C. players
Frickley Athletic F.C. players
Worksop Town F.C. players
English Football League players
Brentford F.C. wartime guest players